Ardeshar Faramji Khabardar, also spelled Ardeshir Pharamji Khabardar, was a Parsi poet from India. He wrote mainly in Gujarati but also in English and Marathi. He wrote under the pen name Adal. Living in Bombay and Madras, he wrote in different styles of poetry and published around forty books. He wrote sonnets about his religion Zoroastrianism also.

Life

Ardeshar was born in a Parsi family in Daman on 6 November 1881. He had primary education in Daman and secondary education from New Bharda Highschool, Bombay. He started a motorcycle accessories business in Madras in 1909. He presided over Gujarati Sahitya Parishad in 1941. He died in Madras on 30 July 1953.

Works

He wrote under several pen names, chiefly under Adal.  His other pen names are Motalal, Khojo Bhagat, Kshemanand Bhatt, Narkesarirao, Shabhunath, Shridhar, Sheshadri, Lakha Bhagat, Valkalrai Thatthakhor and Hunnarsinh Mehta. He wrote around forty books in Gujarati and two in English.

His Gujarati poem, Jya Jya Vase Ek Gujarati, Tya Tya Sadakal Gujarat (Wherever a Gujarati resides, there forever is Gujarat) depicts Gujarati ethnic pride and is widely popular in Gujarat.

He wrote in modern Gujarati instead of Parsi Gujarati. His first work was the poetry collection Kavyarasika, which followed the style of Dalpatram, in 1901. Vilasika, published in 1905, followed the style of Narsinhrao Divetia. Prakashika (1908) is styled as the works of Kalapi and Kant. Bharat no Tankar (1909) and Rashtrika (1940) are collections of patriotic songs. He parodied and satirised Gujarat no Tapasvi and Brahmadiksha of Nanalal as Prabhat no Tapasvi and Kutkutdiksha (1920) under the pen name Motalal. Sandeshika (1925) includes patriotic songs. His Kalika (1926) is a love song in blank verse style. Bhajanika (1928), Darshanika (1931) and Kalyanika (1940) are collections of devotional songs. Rasachandrika (1929, 1941) is a collection of rasa songs in the style of Nanalal and Botadkar. Shriji Iranshah no Pawado depicts the history of Zorostrianism and Gandhi Bapu no Pawado praises Mahatma Gandhi; both are poetry in Marathi powada style. Gandhi Bapu (1948) also has thirty-one songs dedicated to Gandhi. His last collection, Kirtanika, had seventy-five kirtan songs. He also published Malabari na Kavyaratno, an interpretation of poems of Behramji Malabari in 1913.

His only English-language poetry collection The Silken Tassel (1918) had fifty-nine poems. He wrote New light on the Gathas of holy Zarathushtra and Zarathushtra: 101 sonnets depicting the life and teaching of Zoroaster.

He started writing a play titled Manuraj or Vishwanatika styled on Goethe's Faust and Nanalal's free verse in 1936 but never completed or published.

Selected publications

See also
 List of Gujarati-language writers

References

External links
 

Gujarati-language writers
People from Daman and Diu
1881 births
1953 deaths
20th-century Indian poets
Parsi people
Gujarati people
Indian male poets
20th-century Indian male writers
Poets in British India